Louise (Lovisa) Katarina Hammarström (25 May 1849 – 5 November 1917), was a Swedish chemist. She was the first formally trained and educated female Swedish chemist.

Louise Hammarström was the daughter of a vicar. Orphaned at an early age, she grew up at an ironworks in Dalarna, in central Sweden, where she became interested in chemical substances. She was a student at Konstfack, studied chemistry by private lessons, and was in 1875 employed at the laboratory of engineer Werner Cronquist in Stockholm, where she was active as an assistant in 1876-1881. She was then active as mineral chemist at the ironworks of Bångbro (1881–87), Fagersta (1887–91) and Schisshyttan (1891–93). In 1893, she opened her own laboratory, in which she was primarily focused on minerals and geological studies.

Sources 

 Louise Hammarström  Idun (Magazine), Nr. 47, 1885 (Swedish language)

Further reading 
 

Swedish chemists
1849 births
Swedish women chemists
19th-century Swedish scientists
1917 deaths
Swedish women scientists